Portalupi is an Italian surname that may refer to:

Ambrogio Portalupi (1943–1987), Italian racing cyclist 
Piero Portalupi (1913–1971), Italian cinematographer
Sante Portalupi (1909–1984), archbishop and Vatican diplomat